Tiptoft is a surname. Notable people with the surname include:

John Tiptoft (disambiguation), multiple people
Baron Tiptoft
Payn Tiptoft ( 1351– 1413), English politician